Mills County is the name of two counties in the United States:

 Mills County, Iowa
 Mills County, Texas

See also
 Roger Mills County, Oklahoma